Clariant Chemicals India Ltd is a specialty chemicals manufacturing company from the Indian state of Maharashtra. The India office is headquartered in Thane. The main business activity of Clariant Chemicals (India) involves manufacture of specialty chemicals for domestic and industrial use. It manufactures and markets textiles, leather, paints, plastic, printing inks, and agrochemicals products in India. It has presence in many international markets. The company also ran a pigments business which was integrated into the Heubach Group.

CCI is a part of the global Clariant group.

History
In 1956, it was incorporated with technical and financial collaboration from Hoechst and Bayer AG. It was founded by three Indian business groups: the Ruias, the Khataus, and Ghias.

References

External links
Company Profile by indiainfoline.com

Companies based in Maharashtra
Chemical companies of India
Chemical companies established in 1956
Indian companies established in 1956
Bayer
1956 establishments in Bombay State
Companies listed on the National Stock Exchange of India
Companies listed on the Bombay Stock Exchange